The Major League Baseball Game of the Week is the de facto title for nationally televised coverage of regular season Major League Baseball games. The Game of the Week has traditionally aired on Saturday afternoons. When the national networks began televising national games of the week, it opened the door for a national audience to see particular clubs. While most teams were broadcast, emphasis was always on the league leaders and the major market franchises that could draw the largest audience.

Television

2020s

2010s

Notes 
Beginning in 2010, several of the Saturday games aired in prime time during the spring. These telecasts used an exclusivity window from 7 to 10:30 p.m. Eastern Time, as the network revived a pregame show for these games, airing at 7 p.m. with the game at 7:15.

In 2012, the pregame show returned full-time, prompting another change in scheduling. The normal scheduling in 2012 and 2013 was for the pregame airing at either 12:30 or 3:30 p.m. Eastern Time. The pregame is not a part of Fox's exclusive window, which began with the game telecast starting a half-hour later. The scheduling did not change for the spring prime time games, however, as the scheduling for these games remained the same as in 2010 and 2011.
On July 24, 2012, Matt Yoder of Awful Announcing questioned Fox's need to hire local broadcasters on their national telecasts and therefore, bringing about a perceived sense of favoritism towards one of the participating teams. For example, Billy Ripken, who played for the Baltimore Orioles alongside his Hall of Fame brother Cal, was roundly criticized for his perceived favoritism towards the Orioles while broadcasting an Orioles–Detroit Tigers game (even by actor Jeff Daniels via Twitter) for Fox the previous week. The following week came a Philadelphia Phillies–San Francisco Giants telecast on Fox, which was called by Phillies play-by-play announcer Tom McCarthy and former Phillies pitcher Mitch Williams. McCarthy and Williams were in particular, singled out for their rather downbeat manner of calling a Matt Cain home run off Cole Hamels in the top of the 3rd inning. This was contrasted by their more enthusiastic call of Hamels returning the favor with a home run in the bottom half of the inning. In 2019, Len Kasper, who is currently the voice of the Cubs, broadcast Cubs-Nationals on Fox with a rather monotonous tone of voice while calling Nationals home runs.

For the 2014 season, sister cable channel Fox Sports 1 began providing Major League Baseball game coverage, carrying a Fox Saturday Baseball doubleheader on most weeks. FS1's coverage begins with the pregame show a half-hour before the game, which usually starts at 1 or 4 p.m. Eastern Time. A second game usually follows at either 7 or 8 Eastern Time. If there is a gap between the first and second game, a studio show is not aired in between. All of the telecasts are aired nationally instead of on a regional basis; however, the telecast is not exclusive, unless the game is between two teams that whose games are broadcast on the Fox Sports regional networks. Prime time games continue to air on Fox, and once again used the 2010 scheduling formula for these telecasts, including full national exclusivity.
In 2014, the Fox Sports 1 cable network began airing regular-season games over 26 Saturdays. As a result, MLB regular season coverage on the over the air Fox network was reduced to 12 weeks.

2000s

Notes
For a Saturday afternoon telecast of a Los Angeles Dodgers/Chicago Cubs game at Wrigley Field on August 26, 2000, Fox aired a special "Turn Back the Clock" broadcast to commemorate the 61st anniversary of the first televised baseball game. The broadcast started with a recreation of the television technology of 1939, with play-by-play announcer Joe Buck working alone with a single microphone, a single black-and-white camera, and no graphics; each subsequent half-inning would then see the broadcast "jump ahead in time" to a later era, showing the evolving technologies and presentation of network baseball coverage through the years.

In , Fox's Game of the Week telecasts only appeared three times after August 28, due to ratings competition from college football (especially since Fox affiliates may have had syndicated college football broadcasts). One unidentified former Fox broadcaster complained by saying "Fox is MIA on the pennant race, and Joe [Buck] doesn't even do [September 18's] Red Sox-Yankees. What kind of sport would tolerate that?" By this point, Joe Buck was unavailable to call baseball games, since he became Fox's #1 NFL announcer (a job he has held since ). The following two seasons saw similar interruptions in Fox's September coverage.

In 2007, Fox began airing games every Saturday during the season. A new scheduling format was devised, in which all of the regional games started simultaneously. Fox moved the pregame, which became part of the exclusive game window, to 3:30 p.m. Eastern Time. All of the Fox games would then start at 3:55 p.m. Eastern Time, regardless of region. This format gave more leeway for teams not being shown on Fox to schedule daytime games. Fox's exclusivity began at the start of the pregame at 3:30 and ran until 7 p.m. Eastern.
In 2007, Joe Buck was only scheduled to call eight regular season MLB games out of a 26-game schedule for Fox (along with a handful of regional St. Louis Cardinals telecasts on FSN Midwest).
Fox discontinued its pregame show in 2009, with the telecasts now beginning at 4 p.m. Eastern and the game time being pushed to 4:10. Fox gave up the first half-hour of its exclusivity, with its window now beginning at 4 p.m. Eastern Time. This scheduling formula was used through 2011 for the regular season. Beginning in 2010, several of the Saturday games aired in prime time during the spring. These telecasts used an exclusivity window from 7 to 10:30 p.m. Eastern Time, as the network revived a pregame show for these games, airing at 7 p.m. with the game at 7:15.

1990s

Notes
CBS initially did not want to start their 1990 coverage until after the network had aired that year's NBA Finals (which was the last time CBS aired the Finals before the NBA's move to NBC). Therefore, only 12 regular season telecasts were scheduled The broadcasts would have been each Saturday from June 16 through August 25 and a special Sunday telecast on the weekend of August 11–12 (the New York Yankees against the Oakland Athletics in Oakland on both days). Ultimately, four more telecasts were added – two in April and two on the last two Saturdays of the season.

After sustaining huge losses (CBS claimed to have lost about $55 million in after-taxes revenue in 1990, which would go up to $170 million at the end of its four-year contract) from 1990's abbreviated postseason (which ended with the Cincinnati Reds shockingly sweeping the defending World Champion Oakland Athletics in the World Series), CBS made several notable adjustments for 1991. Regular season telecasts were reduced to a meager handful. In return, pregame shows during the League Championship Series were entirely eliminated, to minimize the ratings damage.
On Sunday, May 5, CBS broadcast games involving Cleveland at Oakland (with Jack Buck and Tim McCarver on the call) and Boston at the Chicago White Sox (with Dick Stockton and Jim Kaat on the call). And then on Sunday, July 14, Dick Stockton and Jim Kaat called a game in Anaheim between the New York Yankees and California Angels.

After two years of calling baseball telecasts for CBS, Jack Buck was dismissed in December 1991. According to the radio veteran Buck, he had a hard time adjusting to the demands of a more constricting television production. CBS felt that Buck should have done more to make himself appear to be a set-up man for lead analyst Tim McCarver. Buck's replacement was Boston Red Sox announcer Sean McDonough.

After Major League Baseball's contract with CBS expired at the end of the 1993 season, the league decided to produce its own in-house telecasts of games, which were then brokered to air on ABC and NBC. The package included coverage of games in prime time on selected nights throughout the regular season (under the branding Baseball Night in America), along with coverage of the postseason and the World Series. Unlike previous broadcasting arrangements with the league, there was no national "game of the week" during the regular season; these would be replaced by multiple weekly regional telecasts on certain nights of the week. Additionally, The Baseball Network had exclusive coverage windows; no other broadcaster could televise MLB games during the same night that The Baseball Network was televising games.
After the All-Star Game was complete, ABC took over coverage with what was to be their weekly slate of games. ABC was scheduled to televise six regular season games on Saturdays or Mondays in prime time. NBC would then pick up where ABC left off by televising six more regular season Friday night games. Every Baseball Night in America game was scheduled to begin at 8 p.m. Eastern Time (or 8 p.m. Pacific Time if the game occurred on the West Coast). A single starting time gave the networks the opportunity to broadcast one game and then, simultaneously, cut to another game when there was a break in action.

On November 7, 1995, Major League Baseball reached a television deal with Fox and NBC, allowing the former to obtain MLB game rights (assuming ABC's end of the contract). Fox paid $575 million for the five-year contract, a fraction less of the amount of money that CBS had paid for the Major League Baseball television rights for the 1990–1993 seasons. Unlike the previous television deal, "The Baseball Network" (a partnership created through the league's joint contract with ABC and NBC that began in the 1994 season), Fox reverted to the format of televising regular season games (approximately 16 weekly telecasts that normally began on Memorial Day weekend) on Saturday afternoons. Fox did, however, continue a format that The Baseball Network started by offering a selection of games based purely on a viewer's region. Fox's approach has usually been to offer three regionalized telecasts. The initial deal also gave Fox the rights to broadcast the 1996, 1998 and 2000 World Series, the 1997 and 1999 All-Star Games, as well as coverage of the League Championship Series (shared with NBC) and five Division Series games each year.
Like its predecessor NBC, Fox determined its Saturday schedule by which MLB franchise was playing a team from one of the three largest television markets – New York City, Los Angeles or Chicago. If there was a game which featured teams from two of these three markets (involving any combination of the Yankees, Mets, Dodgers, Angels, Cubs or White Sox), that game would be aired on the network.

1980s

Notes
On October 4, 1980, Bob Costas made his debut calling baseball games for NBC. It was a backup game (the primary game involved the Philadelphia Phillies and Montreal Expos) involving the New York Yankees and Detroit Tigers from Yankee Stadium.

During the 1981 players' strike, NBC used its Saturday Game of the Week time-slot to show a 20-minute strike update, followed by a sports anthology series hosted by Caitlyn Jenner (then Bruce) called NBC Sports: The Summer Season.
Even though Dick Enberg did play-by-play for the 1981 NLCS for NBC (working alongside Tom Seaver), Merle Harmon was, for the most part, NBC's backup baseball play-by-play announcer (serving behind Joe Garagiola, who called that year's ALCS for NBC with Tony Kubek) in 1981. Harmon's broadcast partner during this period was Ron Luciano. In late 1979, Harmon left the Milwaukee Brewers completely in favor of a multi-year pact with NBC. Harmon saw the NBC deal as a perfect opportunity since according to The Milwaukee Journal he would make more money, get more exposure, and do less traveling. At NBC, Harmon did SportsWorld, the backup Game of the Week, and served as a field reporter for the 1980 World Series. Most of all, Harmon had hoped to cover the American-boycotted 1980 Summer Olympics from Moscow. After NBC pulled out of their scheduled coverage of the 1980 Summer Olympics, Harmon considered it to be "a great letdown." To add insult to injury, NBC fired Harmon in 1982 in favor of Bob Costas. It was in 1982 that Costas started working the NBC backup games on a full-time basis, with former Oakland A's third baseman Sal Bando as his color man.

According to his autobiography, Oh My, Dick Enberg (then the lead play-by-play voice for The NFL on NBC) was informed by NBC that he would become the lead play-by-play voice of the Major League Baseball Game of the Week beginning with the 1982 World Series (sharing the play-by-play duties for that game with Joe Garagiola, alongside analyst Tony Kubek) and through subsequent regular seasons. Enberg wrote that on his football trips, he would read every edition of The Sporting News to make sure he was current with all the baseball news and notes. He then met with NBC executives in September 1982, who informed him that Vin Scully was in negotiations to be their lead baseball play-by-play announcer (teaming with Garagiola, while Kubek would team with Bob Costas) and began with the network in the spring of 1983. Therefore, rather than throw him in randomly for one World Series, Enberg wrote that he hosted the pre-game/post-game shows while the team of Joe Garagiola and Tony Kubek did the games. According to the book, Enberg was not pleased about the decision (since he loved being the Los Angeles Angels' radio voice in the 1970s and was eager to return to baseball) but the fact that NBC was bringing in Scully, arguably baseball's best announcer, was understandable. Enberg added that NBC also gave him a significant pay increase as a pseudo-apology for not coming through on the promise to make him the lead baseball play-by-play announcer.

On April 7, 1983, Major League Baseball agreed to terms with ABC and NBC on a six-year television package, worth $1.2 billion. The two networks would continue to alternate coverage of the playoffs (ABC in even-numbered years and NBC in odd-numbered years), World Series (ABC would televise the World Series in odd-numbered years and NBC in even-numbered years) and All-Star Game (ABC would televise the All-Star Game in even-numbered years and NBC in odd-numbered years) through the 1989 season, with each of the 26 clubs receiving $7 million per year in return (even if no fans showed up). This was a substantial increase over the last package, in which each club was being paid $1.9 million per year. ABC contributed $575 million for the rights to televise prime time and Sunday afternoon regular season games and NBC paid $550 million for the rights to broadcast 30 Saturday afternoon games.

1984 was the first year that the Game of the Week was not subject to blackout. NBC and ABC generally still aired two games each week, with a primary game carried to most of the country and a secondary game to mostly the markets that would carry that game. This was mostly done for insurance in the event that a game was rained out. During the 1970s and early 1980s, many of the "rainout insurance" games involved the Houston Astros since that team played in a domed ballpark. Therefore, if the Astros were at home on a given Saturday or Monday night, then it was a safe bet that the game would be shown on network television, due to the Astros being the only "dome" team (until the Seattle Mariners began play in the Kingdome in 1977).

If not that, then Miller would appear on Saturday afternoon regionals the day after NBC's occasional prime time telecasts.

After calling the 1988 World Series with Vin Scully, Joe Garagiola resigned from NBC Sports. Although it was not official at the time, NBC was on the verge of losing the television rights to cover Major League Baseball to CBS. Garagiola claimed that NBC left him "twisting" while he was trying to renegotiate his deal. Joe Garagiola was replaced by Tom Seaver for the 1989 season.

1970s

Notes
In 1971, Sandy Koufax signed a ten-year contract with NBC for $1 million to serve as a broadcaster on the Saturday Game of the Week. Koufax never felt comfortable being in front of the camera, and quit before the 1973 season.

Starting in 1975, Joe Garagiola and Curt Gowdy alternated as the Saturday Game of Week play-by-play announcers with Tony Kubek doing color analysis. Then on weeks in which NBC had Monday Night Baseball, Gowdy and Garagiola worked together. One would call play-by-play for 4½ innings, the other would handle color analysis. Then in the bottom of the 5th inning, their roles switched. Ultimately, in November 1975, Chrysler forced NBC to totally remove Curt Gowdy from NBC's top baseball team. Instead, the company wanted their spokesman, Joe Garagiola, to call all the main regular season games, All-Star Games (when NBC had them), the top League Championship Series (when NBC had it), and the World Series (when NBC had it).

1960s

Notes
In , ABC typically did three games a week. Two of the games were always from the Eastern or Central Time Zone. The late games (no doubleheaders) were usually San Francisco Giants or Los Angeles Dodgers' home games. However, the Milwaukee Braves used to start many of their Saturday home games late in the afternoon. So if the Giants and Dodgers were both the road at the same time, ABC still would be able to show a late game.
Jerry Coleman hosted the pregame show for CBS' Game of the Week broadcasts.

Despite temporarily losing the Game of the Week package in 1961, ABC still televised several games in prime time (with Jack Buck returning to call the action). This occurred as Roger Maris was poised to tie and subsequently break Babe Ruth's regular season home run record of 60. As with all Major League Baseball games in those days, the action was totally blacked out of major league markets. As a matter of fact, as documented in the HBO film 61*, the Maris family was welcomed into ABC's Kansas City, Missouri affiliate KMBC-TV so they could watch the in-house feed of the game, which was blacked out of Kansas City.

In 1962, CBS dropped the Sunday baseball Game of the Week once the NFL season started, dropping the option clause for affiliates to carry baseball or football in place since 1957.

By , CBS' Dean and Reese called games from Yankee Stadium, Wrigley Field, St. Louis, Philadelphia and Baltimore. The New York Yankees got a $550,000 share of CBS' $895,000. Six clubs that exclusively played nationally televised games on NBC were paid $1.2 million.

In , ABC provided the first-ever nationwide baseball coverage with weekly Saturday broadcasts on a regional basis. ABC paid $5.7 million for the rights to the 28 Saturday/holiday Games of the Week. ABC's deal covered all of the teams except the New York Yankees and Philadelphia Phillies (who had their own television deals) and called for two regionalized games on Saturdays, Independence Day, and Labor Day. Each Saturday, ABC broadcast two 2 p.m. games and one 5 p.m. game for the Pacific Time Zone. ABC blacked out the games in the home cities of the clubs playing those games. Major League Baseball however, had a TV deal with NBC for the All-Star Game and World Series.
Until 1965 (when Major League Baseball made its first ever, league-wide regular-season network television deal with ABC), there was no league-wide national television package for regular season Major League Baseball games. As a result, teams, if they so desired, could sell the rights to the networks. Also prior to 1965, regular season Major League Baseball telecasts broadcast by networks had to be blacked-out in cities with league franchises. More to the point, by around the year prior, thanks to expansion (in 1960 and 1961), regular season MLB games shown on network television were blacked out in most major markets. However, the network Games of the Week, up until the late 1980s, still could not be seen in the two cities whose local teams were playing in each respective game.
From 1965 until the late 1980s, networks would cover two Saturday afternoon games each week: one that went to most of the network (a "primary game"), and the second being seen only in the home markets of the two teams playing in the network's "primary" game. Although the "primary" game would not be televised in each team's home markets, local television rights-holders in those cities were free to broadcast that game. The manner that this worked allowed, for instance, a network's two Saturday afternoon Games of the Week involving the New York Yankees at the Boston Red Sox serving as the primary game and St. Louis Cardinals at the Chicago Cubs being the secondary game. The Yankees-Red Sox game would as a result, be seen everywhere except in New York City, Boston and possibly markets adjacent to those cities. Ultimately, those markets got the Cardinals-Cubs game instead.

In , the New York Yankees, which in the year prior played 21 Games of the Week for CBS (which had actually just purchased the Yankees), joined NBC's television package. The new package under NBC called for 28 games compared to the 123 aired across the three networks in 1960.
The New York Yankees, which, the year before, had played 21 Games of the Week for CBS, joined NBC's package in 1966. The new package under NBC called for 28 games, as compared to the 123 combined among three networks during the 1960s. On October 19, 1966, NBC signed a three-year contract with Major League Baseball. As previously mentioned, the year before, Major League Baseball sold an exclusive league-wide television package for the rights to the Saturday-Sunday Game of the Week to ABC. NBC covered only the All-Star Game and World Series in 1965. In addition, a previous deal limited CBS to covering only twelve weekends when its new subsidiary, the New York Yankees, played at home. As previously mentioned, before 1965, NBC aired a slate of Saturday afternoon games beginning in 1957. Under the new deal, NBC paid roughly US$6 million per year for the 25 Games of the Week, $6.1 million for the 1967 World Series and All-Star Game, and $6.5 million for the 1968 World Series and 1968 All-Star Game. This brought the total value of the contract (which included three Monday night telecasts such as a Labor Day 1966 contest between the San Francisco Giants and Los Angeles Dodgers) up to $30.6 million.
On April 16, 1966, in New York City, about 50 baseball, network, and advertising officials discussed NBC's first year with the Game of the Week. New York could not get a primary match-up between the Detroit Tigers and New York Yankees with Curt Gowdy and Pee Wee Reese calling the action because of local blackout rules. Instead, that market received a backup game (or "'B' game") featuring Tony Kubek and Jim Simpson calling a game between the Cincinnati Reds and Chicago Cubs. That rule would be eliminated after the 1983 season.

1950s

Notes
In April 1953, ABC-TV executive Edgar J. Scherick set out to sell teams rights but instead, only got the Philadelphia Athletics, Cleveland Indians, and Chicago White Sox to sign on. These were not "national" broadcast contracts since they were assembled through negotiations with individual teams to telecast games from their home parks. It was until the Sports Broadcasting Act of 1961, that antitrust laws barred "pooled rights" TV contracts negotiated with a central league broadcasting authority.

In , George Kell served as host for the pregame show on CBS. 
From 1958 to 1960, NBC aired a special regional feed of its games in the southeast, where the network had a different sponsor (such as National Bohemian beer) than for the rest of the country. This feed featured its own announcing team, with Chuck Thompson calling the games with Bill Veeck (1958) and Al Rosen (1959–60). NBC never had a true backup game until 1966, when the network got exclusivity for the Game of the Week. In the process, NBC brought in Curt Gowdy and Pee Wee Reese for the primary game, and Jim Simpson and Tony Kubek for the alternate game (which was always shown in the markets of teams playing in the primary game).

Radio

2020s

Notes
 For the 2020 season, due to the COVID-19 pandemic, Jon Sciambi and Chris Singleton called each game remote working, rather than from the ballpark. For the 2020 postseason, they and all of ESPN Radio's announcers called the games from the ESPN studios in Bristol, Connecticut.

2010s

Notes
As of 2011, the primary ESPN Radio crew for Sunday Night Baseball consists of play-by-play announcer Jon Sciambi and color analyst Chris Singleton. In 2010, Sciambi succeeded Gary Thorne, who had called play-by-play in 2008–09; Thorne had succeeded Dan Shulman, did so from 2002–07; Shulman, in turn, had been preceded by Charley Steiner from 1998–2002. Singleton succeeded Dave Campbell, who was an analyst from 1999–2010. Campbell replaced Kevin Kennedy as analyst in 1999, after the latter had worked with Steiner in the network's inaugural season of coverage. Marc Kestecher currently serves as the network's primary Baseball Tonight studio host; he was preceded by Joe D'Ambrosio from 1998–2007.
As of 2018, Dan Shulman calls the World Series and one of the two League Championship Series with Singleton each year, while Sciambi calls the other LCS with Sunday Night Baseball TV analyst Jessica Mendoza. Various other announcers work the network's secondary regular-season, Wild Card Game and Division Series broadcasts as needed. Sciambi and Singleton also call the All-Star Game and Home Run Derby each year.

On May 15, 2012, the Los Angeles Angels of Anaheim signed a radio rights deal with syndicator Compass Media to distribute 25 games to a nationwide audience, in a game-of-the-week format.  These games would be produced separately from the KLAA broadcasts, and would feature veteran play-by-play men Chris Carrino and Steve Quis, with former New York Mets general manager and current SiriusXM sports talk show host Steve Phillips and former MLB player Darryl Hamilton as color commentators.

2000s

1990s

Notes
In 1998, ESPN Radio took over from CBS Radio as the official, national radio broadcaster for Major League Baseball. The games include Opening Day, Sunday Night Baseball, Saturday Game of the Week, holiday games and September pennant race games.

1985-1989

Notes
In , CBS Radio started broadcasting a weekly Game of the Week. CBS Radio usually did two games each Saturday, one on the afternoons and another during the evenings. Typically, CBS' markets aired only the afternoon broadcasts. The games covered varied from the ones NBC-TV were offering at the time to games outside of NBC's sight. One notable exception was KCBS in San Francisco, who almost always did the evening games. In , just before the strike, KNBR carried the broadcasts in San Francisco and finally aired some of CBS' afternoon games.
From –, the two announcers calling the games at hand split play-by-play duties.

1950s-1960

Notes
In 1957, NBC replaced Mutual as the exclusive national radio broadcaster for the World Series and All-Star Game. The network would continue in this role through 1975, with CBS taking over the rights the following year. NBC Radio did not air regular season games during this period (save for the three-game National League pennant playoff series in 1959 and 1962); nor did the network cover the League Championship Series from 1969 to 1975, those series instead having local team radio broadcasts syndicated nationally over ad hoc networks.

1939-1940s

Notes
In the 1940s and 1950s, Wes Wise was a play-by-play sports announcer for Gordon McLendon's Liberty Broadcasting System radio network, which mainly broadcast live recreations of Major League Baseball games by means of broadcasters like Wise following the action via Western Union ticker tape reports, and then relaying the plays to the listening audience in a more lively style that included studio sound effects meant to simulate the ballgames.
According to Time magazine articles of the era, McLendon only paid Major League Baseball $1,000.00 per year for the rights to broadcast the games, but in 1951, the leagues raised the price to $250,000.00 per year, and prohibited broadcasts in any city which had a minor league franchise and in the northeastern and midwestern United States.
Sports were the lifeblood of the Liberty Broadcasting System. Restrictions on Major League Baseball broadcasts in minor league franchise areas, as well as bans on National Football League broadcasts within a 75-mile range of league cities, were the one-two blow which ended the network. Since the baseball games were a major draw for both listeners and affiliates, the blackout was a disaster for the fledgling company, which had only posted modest profits during its first few years of operation. More than 100 stations left the network, and, faced with mounting debts, on May 16, 1952, the network ceased broadcasting.

Following the lead of the rival Liberty Broadcasting System, Mutual also aired regular-season Game of the Day broadcasts (a precursor to television's Game of the Week concept) to non-major-league cities throughout the 1940s and 1950s.

See also
List of Major League Baseball on ABC announcers
List of Major League Baseball on Fox broadcasters
List of Major League Baseball on NBC broadcasters
List of current Major League Baseball broadcasters
Game of the Week radio broadcasters
CBS Radio
ESPN Radio

References

External links
Searchable Network TV Broadcasts

ABC Sports
Major League Baseball on Fox
CBS Sports
Major League Baseball on NBC
Game of the Week broadcasters
Game of the Week
CBS Radio Sports
ESPN Radio
Game of the Week broadcasters